William Larsson (1873–1926) was a Swedish silent film actor. He appeared in more than 30 films between 1912 and 1925.

Selected filmography
 Ingeborg Holm (1913)
 Half Breed (1913)
 The Clergyman (1914)
 Judge Not (1914)
 Daughter of the Peaks (1914)
 The Lass from the Stormy Croft (1917)
 The Outlaw and His Wife (1918)
 A Lover in Pawn (1920)
 Iron Will (1923)
 The Österman Brothers' Virago (1925)

References

External links

1873 births
1926 deaths
Swedish male film actors
Swedish male silent film actors
20th-century Swedish male actors